The Western Cape Department of Economic Development and Tourism (EDAT) is the department of the Western Cape government responsible for economic policy, economic planning and economic development within the province. It is also liable for promoting and developing the provincial tourism sector.

As of May 2019, the political head of the department has been Provincial Minister David Maynier. He also oversees the Provincial Treasury. The non-political head is Solly Fourie.

See also
Economy of the Western Cape
Government of the Western Cape

References

External links
Western Cape Department: Economic Development and Tourism

Government of the Western Cape
Subnational economy ministries
Western Cape
Tourism ministries